is a former Japanese football player and manager currently manager of Japan Football League club MIO Biwako Shiga.

Playing career
Otsuki was born in Nagaokakyo on April 23, 1980. He joined J1 League club Kyoto Purple Sanga from youth team in 1999. He debuted in August and played many matches as substitute defensive midfielder after the debut. However he could hardly play in the match from 2000. In 2004, he moved to Japan Football League club Sagawa Printing (later Sagawa Printing Kyoto). He became a regular player and played many matches for a long time. His opportunity to play decreased in 2014 and he retired end of 2014 season.

Coaching career
After retirement, Otsuki became a manager for SP Kyoto FC in 2015. However the club was disbanded end of 2015 season.

Club statistics

References

External links

kyotosangadc

1980 births
Living people
Association football people from Kyoto Prefecture
Japanese footballers
J1 League players
J2 League players
Japan Football League players
Kyoto Sanga FC players
SP Kyoto FC players
Japanese football managers
Association football midfielders